Thomas Deruette (born 6 July 1995) is a Belgian former professional road bicycle racer, who rode professionally between 2014 and 2019.

He held the mountain jersey for two days at the 2016 Tour de Luxembourg, and he also held the mountain jersey for two days at the 2016 Tour de Wallonie. He competed in the 2017 Liège–Bastogne–Liège, but did not finish.

References

External links

1995 births
Living people
Belgian male cyclists